Daniel was an Egyptian Christian monk who lived around the 4th century in the desert of Lower Egypt. He was one of the Desert Fathers.

He was a disciple and biographer of Arsenius the Great. Daniel was a disciple of Arsenius up to his death in 449 A.D.

References

4th-century births
5th-century deaths
Egyptian Christian monks
Saints from Roman Egypt
Coptic Orthodox saints
Desert Fathers